Nyctalopin is a protein located on the surface of photoreceptor-to-ON bipolar cell synapse in the retina. It is composed of 481 amino acids. and is encoded in human by the NYX gene. This gene is found on the chromosome X and has two exons. This protein is a leucine-rich proteoglycan which is expressed in the eye, spleen and brain in mice. Mutations in this gene cause congenital stationary night blindness in humans (CSNB). which is a stable retinal disorder. The consequence of this mutation results in an abnormal night vision. Nyctalopin is critical due to the fact that it generates a depolarizing bipolar cell response due to the mutation on the NYX gene. Most of the time, CSNB are associated to hygh myopia which is the result of a mutation on the same gene. Several mutations can occur on the NYX gene resulting on many form of night blindness in humans. Some studies show that these mutations are more present in Asian population than in Caucasian population. A mouse strain called nob (no b-wave) carries a spontaneous mutation leading to a frameshift in this gene. These mice are used as an animal model for congenital stationary night blindness.

Discovery
The first evidence of the existence of mutation in NYX gene, encoding the leucine-rich proteoglycan nyctalopin, cause X-linked complete congenital stationary night blindness was provided by Richard G. Weleber at the University of Alberta in 2000.

Gene location
The NYX gene is located on the short arm (p) of chromosome X, from base pair 41,447,434  to base pair 41,475,710.

Protein structure
Nyctalopin contains a N-terminal signal peptide and a C-terminal glycosylphosphatidylinositol (GPI) anchor. Predicted signal sequence is likely to be processed by a co-translational mechanism. Nyctalopin does not have two transmembrane domains and the only transmembrane domain is found to be between the amino acid 452 ad 472. In the endoplasmic reticulum, the protein is oriented with the N-terminus in the lumen of the endoplasmic reticulum and the C-terminus is located in the cytoplasm. The central part of the polypeptide encodes 11 consecutive leucines-rich repeats (LRRs). These LRR are flanked by N-terminal and C-terminal rich LRRs Tandem LRRs domains are folded into ß-sheets and α-helices, all joined by loops. According to the cysteine pattern, nyctalopin is part of the class II small leucine-rich proteoglycans. These proteins, are involved in several functions such as cell signalling, growth control, and formation of the extracellular matrix. LRR domains are involved in the protein–protein interaction in small leucine rich repeat proteoglycan family members. Also, LRR domains have a critical role in nyctalopin function. Congenital stationary night blindness in humans appears when a mutation in the LRR domains of nyctalopin occurs.

Mutations
The complete form of congenital stationary night blindness is due to the absence of nyctalopin. This absence is due to a mutation involving an 85 base pair deletion. In humans, more than 30 mutations are found in the NYX gene and most of them have an impact either on the tertiary structure of the LRR domains of nyctalopin or to truncate the protein.

References

Further reading

External links 
  GeneReviews/NCBI/NIH/UW entry on X-Linked Congenital Stationary Night Blindness

Proteoglycans